Tamsahelte (Arabic: تمساهلت) is a small village in the Zagora Province of the Drâa-Tafilalet district in southeastern Morocco, about 10 kilometers northwest of Tazzarine and 20 kilometers east of N'Kob. The village has about five hundred inhabitants. People live from agriculture. Despite the dry climate, wells produce sufficient water for the residents and for irrigation of the gardens. Tamsahelte and its region are well known for the good quality of the henna plants and dates. The language spoken in this region is Tamazight.
The population is mostly elderly people. There is no industry or other means of earning money. Therefore younger people leave the village to look for a job in larger cities. In this way, they can support their parents. The climate is very dry and it is hard to cultivate vegetables and sell them on the markets. To get some water to irrigate the gardens they have to dig deep. It is remarkable that farmers are only allowed to dig up to 40 meters, but in some areas, farmers need to drill to a depth of 250 or 300 meters or even more to find the water they need. Usually, this water is not drinkable.

Nearby villages 
 Abdi n'ilmchane
 Ait Ouazik
N'kob
 Oum raman
 Tanoumrit
 Tazzarine
 Timarighin

Climate
Tamsahelte is considered a desert-like climate, usually sunny and warm. The highest average temperature is in July, at around 32.1 °C. The lowest average temperatures in the year occur in January, at around 10.1 °C.

See also
 List of municipalities, communes, and arrondissements of Morocco

External links 

Tourist information
Adventure activities in Tamsahelte

References 

Populated places in Zagora Province